Saifur Rahman Rana Bangladesh Nationalist Party politician. He was elected a member of parliament from Kurigram-1 in February 1996.

Career 
Rana was Kurigram District BNP general secretary. He was elected to parliament from Kurigram-1 as a Bangladesh Nationalist Party candidate in 15 February 1996 Bangladeshi general election.

He was defeated from Kurigram-1 constituency on 12 June 1996, 2001, 2008 and 2018 on the nomination of Bangladesh Nationalist Party.

References 

Living people
Year of birth missing (living people)
People from Kurigram District
Bangladesh Nationalist Party politicians
6th Jatiya Sangsad members